Mitchell James Cole (6 October 1985 – 30 November 2012) was an English footballer who played as a winger. Cole was forced to retire from professional football in 2011 as a result of a deteriorating heart condition, hypertrophic cardiomyopathy, that meant it was dangerous for him to continue playing competitive football.

Cole started his career in the academy at West Ham United. He was released in 2004 and joined Grays Athletic. During his first season with Grays, the club won the Conference South title, as well as the FA Trophy. He joined Southend United in 2005, spending a year-and-a-half at the club before signing for Stevenage Borough for an undisclosed fee in January 2007. He scored in the first ever competitive final at the new Wembley Stadium as Stevenage won the FA Trophy in May 2007; also winning the trophy again in May 2009. He helped Stevenage earn promotion to the Football League for the first time in their history during the 2009–10 campaign, finishing the season as Conference Premier champions.

In June 2010, Cole signed for League Two club Oxford United, playing six times before retiring from professional football in February 2011 due to a heart condition. Ahead of the 2011–12 season, Cole joined Stotfold and played twice for them. He then spent time playing at Southern Football League clubs Hitchin Town and Biggleswade Town, before joining Arlesey Town in January 2012.

Club career

Early career
Born in London, Cole started his football career at Norwich City's centre of excellence, based in Potters Bar, Hertfordshire. When the centre was closed, Cole joined West Ham United's academy. He was released by West Ham in 2004. Having struggled with injuries towards the end of his time at West Ham, Cole contemplated giving up playing football. He put on a stone in weight and did not play for a year.

It was suggested to him to train with Essex club Grays Athletic in the summer of 2004. He was subsequently offered a contract by Grays manager Mark Stimson. He played regularly during the 2004–05 season and helped Grays achieve promotion from the Conference South to the Conference National, scoring five goals in 35 appearances. That season, Cole also started in the 2005 FA Trophy Final against Hucknall Town on 23 May 2005; a match in which Grays won on penalties. Cole's performances for Grays meant he was signed by League One club Southend United on 13 July 2005. He joined Southend for an undisclosed fee. He made his Southend debut in the club's opening match of the 2005–06 season, starting in a 2–1 defeat against Port Vale at Roots Hall. He stated similarities between Southend manager Steve Tilson and previous manager Stimson meant he settled in quickly at Southend. He played 31 times for the club during the season. He scored his only Southend goal in a 3–1 win over rivals Colchester United, and helped Southend achieve promotion to the Championship.

Having made two appearances for Southend in the opening month of the 2006–07 season, Cole felt he needed more game-time. Whilst Tilson did not want him to go, he agreed to loan out Cole to League One club  Northampton Town for a month. Cole made his Northampton debut in a 3–1 defeat against Tranmere Rovers at Sixfields. He scored his first goal for Northampton against Millwall in a 1–0 away victory on 24 September 2006. His loan agreement at Northampton was extended for a further month on 11 October 2006, and he went on to play nine times during his time with the club. He returned to Southend in November 2006, and made three more appearances for the club before his run was curtailed by injury.

Stevenage
Cole subsequently joined Conference Premier club Stevenage Borough for a five-figure fee on 26 January 2007. The move reunited him with manager Mark Stimson, who had previously managed him at Grays. He made his Stevenage debut as a substitute in a 1–1 draw at Stonebridge Road against Ebbsfleet United on 28 January 2007. Cole went on to make 22 more appearances during the 2006–07 season, scoring three times; his first goal for the club coming in a 4–4 away draw against Forest Green Rovers on 9 April 2007. Cole scored Stevenage's first goal in a 3–2 victory in the FA Trophy final against Kidderminster Harriers at Wembley Stadium in front of 53,262 spectators, a game in which Stevenage came from two goals behind to become the first team to win a competitive final at the new stadium. Cole's goal came just after half-time; collecting Steve Morison's flick-on before finishing calmly. At the start of the 2007–08 season, Cole suffered a knee injury in Stevenage's victory against Histon, which meant he missed the next six weeks of the season. He scored two goals in 27 appearances during the season. Cole scored 14 times during the 2008–09 season under manager Graham Westley, including the first competitive hat-trick of his career in a 4–2 victory away at Salisbury City. He signed a two-year contract extension at Stevenage on 22 April 2009.

During the 2009–10 season, Cole scored his first goal of the season in a 2–0 victory over Kidderminster Harriers on 5 December 2009. He played two games at left-back as opposed to his usual left wing position in January 2010. He scored his second professional hat-trick for Stevenage the following month, in a 6–0 win away at Eastbourne Borough on 2 March 2010, coming on as a substitute in the 71st-minute and scoring his three goals in seven minutes. Cole played 42 games during the season, scoring four goals, as Stevenage earned promotion to the Football League for the first time in the club's history. During his three-and-a-half-years with the club, Cole made 146 appearances in all competitions, scoring 23 times.

Oxford United
Cole joined newly promoted League Two club Oxford United on a two-year contract on 14 June 2010. He made his Oxford debut in the club's 2–1 home defeat against Bury on 14 August 2010, coming on as an 81st-minute substitute. Cole started his first game for Oxford ten days later, playing 45 minutes in the club's 1–0 League Cup defeat to former club West Ham United. Cole played six matches for Oxford in all competitions, with his last appearance coming in a 3–2 defeat to Macclesfield Town on 16 October 2010.

Retirement
In February 2011, Cole's career as a professional football ended prematurely when he was forced to retire due to a serious heart condition. During his time at West Ham, at the age of 17, Cole discovered he had a heart condition, but continued to play as his condition gradually improved. In November 2010, Cole began to suffer from shortness of breath during training and matches, and was subsequently advised by a leading cardiologist to stop playing competitive football to avoid the risk of a serious heart episode. On retiring, Cole said "It's like being hit by a ton of bricks because football is all I've ever known. I've managed to get eight years out of the professional game which I am extremely happy with".

Return to semi-professional football
Ahead of the 2011–12 season, Cole played in a number of pre-season friendlies for Stotfold of the Spartan South Midlands League. He played in the club's first competitive game of the season, a 2–0 home win over Oxhey Jets. Two days later, on 15 August 2011, Cole joined Hitchin Town on non-contract terms, who play in the Southern League Premier Division. He made his debut for the club on the same day, playing 65 minutes in Hitchin's 3–0 home victory against Hemel Hempstead Town. Owing to the fact that Cole signed for Hitchin on a non-contract basis, he played in Stotfold's 2–1 home win against St. Margaretsbury the following day. Cole scored his first goal for Hitchin in a 3–1 away victory over Bedford Town on 29 August 2011. He left Hitchin on 17 November 2011. Cole made 14 appearances for the club, scoring once.

Shortly after leaving Hitchin Town, Cole joined Biggleswade Town, who play in the Division One Central of the Southern League. He made his debut for the club on 19 November 2011, coming on as a substitute in a 1–1 home draw with Slough Town. He went on to make six appearances for Biggleswade, scoring one goal, before joining Arlesey Town on 7 January 2012.

International career
Cole was called up to the England C team, who represent England at non-League level, in February 2005, for a friendly against the Netherlands. He scored the only goal for England C in a 1–0 victory over Finland C in June 2007. He also scored the winning goal in both games against Wales XI and Gibraltar in 2008. Cole was subsequently called up for the England C tour of the Caribbean in June 2008, in which Cole played both games against Grenada and Barbados respectively. During the 2008–09 season, Cole played in the 6–2 defeat to Bosnia and Herzegovina A team. He also made further appearances against Italy C and Malta in the same season. Cole's seven goals in 14 appearances makes him the non-League national team's second-highest goalscorer of all-time.

Personal life
Cole had three children with his wife, Charly, who is the sister of fellow professional footballer and England international Joe Cole. Charly gave birth to their third child, daughter Leni, on 7 December 2012, just a week after Cole's death. Mitchell's younger brother Ben Cole started The Mitchell Cole Memorial Tournament in honour of his brother and to raise money for the charity Cardiomyopathy UK.

Death
Cole died on 30 November 2012, aged 27.

Tributes were widely paid to Cole following his death. Cole's first club, Grays Athletic, released a statement — "He is best remembered for his rampaging runs down the left wing, and for scoring some spectacular goals". Stevenage chairman Phil Wallace also paid tribute — "It's such a sad, tragic loss of a young life. Mitch was a key figure for us in the seasons that saw us enjoy a lot of success. We all knew of his condition but it's simply devastating that a young family with such spirit is taken from us so suddenly". Former England C manager Paul Fairclough, who once stated Cole had "the potential to be the new Ryan Giggs", said he was "shattered" by the news of Cole's death. In an emotional tribute, Fairclough went on to say — "Off the pitch Mitch was fun to be around. He had an amazing outlook on life with a wicked sense of humour. He was admired and respected by people of all ages. He had time for everyone; from the tiny tots to senior football people. He was uncomplicated, extremely approachable and would chat with all types. I cannot believe this bright eyed young man has been taken from us".

Grays Athletic held a minute's silence ahead of their game against Ware on the same day, while Oxford United players wore black armbands during their 3–3 draw with Accrington Stanley. Without a first-team match on the day of Cole's death, Stevenage fans paid tribute to Cole by applauding on the 21st minute, the number he wore during his time at the club, during the club's 2–1 FA Youth Cup win over Wigan Athletic. The following day, AFC Wimbledon players wore armbands with 'Mitch' written on them, during their televised FA Cup tie against Milton Keynes Dons. Wimbledon striker Jack Midson dedicated his goal to Cole — "The goal meant a lot to me because my friend Mitchell Cole died". Ahead of Oxford United's first home match since Cole's death, against Aldershot Town on 8 December 2012, Oxford United players warmed up in commemorative T-shirts reading "Team Mates Forever – Cole 17". There was also a minute's applause in tribute to Cole before the match. Stevenage paid a host of tributes to Cole during their first home match since his death, a game against Crawley Town on 15 December, with all Stevenage players and staff wearing white T-shirts with "Cole – 21" on the back prior to the match. A minute's silence was held before kick-off, and both sets of supporters clapped during the 21st minute of the match. The following day, Cole was remembered, along with a number of sportspeople who died in 2012, during the 2012 BBC Sports Personality of the Year award ceremony.

Stevenage chairman Phil Wallace announced that the club had planned a benefit match for Cole, to be played at Broadhall Way in May 2013. The club later announced that the match would take place on Tuesday 7 May 2013 at Broadhall Way. The match was between a Mitchell Cole XI and a Stevenage XI, with two of Cole's former managers Mark Stimson and Graham Westley managing the two teams. A crowd of over 2,300 turned out to watch the Cole XI side win 7–4. Among those playing in the match were brother-in-law Joe Cole, as well as James Collins, Andy Carroll, Gary Hooper, Matt Jarvis and Kevin Nolan. Both teams were also made up of many of Cole's former teammates from a number of his previous clubs. Proceeds from the match were split between the Cole family and its chosen charity, The Cardiomyopathy Association.

Career statistics

A.  The "Other" column constitutes appearances and goals (including those as a substitute) in the FA Trophy and Football League Trophy.

Honours
Grays Athletic
 Conference South: 2004–05
 FA Trophy: 2004–05

Southend United
 League One: 2005–06

Stevenage
 FA Trophy: 2006–07, 2008–09; runner-up: 2009–10
 Conference Premier: 2009–10

References

External links

1985 births
2012 deaths
Footballers from Greater London
English footballers
England semi-pro international footballers
Association football midfielders
Norwich City F.C. players
West Ham United F.C. players
Grays Athletic F.C. players
Southend United F.C. players
Northampton Town F.C. players
Stevenage F.C. players
Oxford United F.C. players
Stotfold F.C. players
Hitchin Town F.C. players
Biggleswade Town F.C. players
Arlesey Town F.C. players
English Football League players
National League (English football) players
Southern Football League players